Li Yajie is a Chinese diver. She competed at the 2022 World Aquatics Championships, winning the gold medal 
in the women's 1 metre springboard event.

References

External links 

Living people
Place of birth missing (living people)
Year of birth missing (living people)
Chinese female divers
World Aquatics Championships medalists in diving
21st-century Chinese women